Darknetlive is a news and information site covering darknet markets and other dark web activities.

Regular topics include major drug dealer 'vendor' arrests, and all kinds of information surrounding darknet market activities and closures.

A part of the Blueleaks hack, an FBI document mentions that non-commercial sites such as Darknetlive are "legal gateways" for accessing darknet markets.

External links

References 

Dark web
American news websites
Darknet markets